The name Elasippus may refer to:

Elasippus, in Greek mythology, one of the Achaean soldiers killed by Penthesilea (Quintus Smyrnaeus, Fall of Troy, 1. 229)
Elasippus, in Plato's myth of Atlantis, one of the ten sons of Poseidon and Cleito
Elasippus, encaustic painter mentioned by Pliny the Elder (Naturals Historia 25. 122)